Bolshaya Polovina is a rural locality (a village) in Yurlinskoye Rural Settlement, Yurlinsky District, Perm Krai, Russia. The population was 116 as of 2010. There are 2  streets.

Geography 
Bolshaya Polovina is located 17 km east of Yurla (the district's administrative centre) by road. Anankina is the nearest rural locality.

References 

Rural localities in Yurlinsky District